Pope Pius XII consecration to the Immaculate Heart of Mary may refer to:

 Pope Pius XII 1942 consecration to the Immaculate Heart of Mary
 Pope Pius XII's 1952 consecration of the people of Russia to the Immaculate Heart of Mary in Sacro vergente anno

See also 

 Consecration of Russia